Tennessee Stud is a recording by American folk music and country blues artist Doc Watson, released in 2003.

Track listing
 "Tennessee Stud" (Jimmie Driftwood) – 4:50
 "Freight Train Boogie" (Watson) – 3:02
 "Milk Cow Blues" (Kokomo Arnold) – 2:15
 "Doc's Rag" (Watson) – 1:46
 "My Rose of Old Kentucky" (Bill Monroe) – 2:38
 "Double File/Salt Creek" – 1:40
 "Blues, Stay Away from Me" (Delmore, Delmore, Glover) – 2:49
 "Mama Don't Allow No Music" (Traditional) – 4:12
 "Darlin' Cory" (Traditional) – 2:36
 "God Holds the Future" (Traditional) – 2:51

References

2003 compilation albums
Doc Watson compilation albums